Völk may refer to:
 Völk, a German diacritical variant of the surname Volk
 6189 Völk, an asteroid in the main-belt